Charles Frederick Bishop (October 14, 1844 – September 14, 1913) was Mayor of the City of Buffalo, New York, serving 1890–1894.  He was born in Williamsville, New York on October 14, 1844. At an early age his parents moved to Buffalo. He married Kate Moran on August 6, 1865. In 1869, he established a wholesale coffee, tea, and spice store at 80 Main Street.

He was elected mayor of Buffalo on November 6, 1889, as the Democratic candidate.  He was reelected to a second term on November 3, 1891.  After his second term was completed, Bishop returned to his private business.  On September 14, 1913, he died in his home and was buried in Forest Lawn Cemetery.

References

External links
Charles Frederick Bishop entry at The Political Graveyard

1844 births
1913 deaths
Burials at Forest Lawn Cemetery (Buffalo)
Deaths from cancer in New York (state)
Mayors of Buffalo, New York
New York (state) Democrats
People from Williamsville, New York
19th-century American politicians